NDMA may refer to:

 N-Nitrosodimethylamine, a semi-volatile organic compound
 National Disaster Management Authority (India)
 National Disaster Management Authority (Pakistan)